Padina is a village of approximately 340 people situated in Devnya Municipality, Varna Province, Bulgaria. 

Small and middle-sized farmers produce grain, corn, wheat, sunflowers, cow milk, goat milk, sheep milk, meat, chicken, geese, ducks and other poultry as their main means of economic production.

External links
An initiative group from Padina works on future topics
Bulgarian cooks from Padina creating Bulgarian gourmet products
Bulgarian culture in Padina
Bulgarian partys in the village Padina

Villages in Varna Province